The Boys Singles tournament of the 2012 BWF World Junior Championships was held from October 30 until November 3. Zulfadli Zulkiffli from Malaysia is the last edition winner.

Japanese Kento Momota clinched the title after beating Chinese Xue Song in the thrilling final match by 21–17, 19–21, 21–19.

Seeded

  Viktor Axelsen (quarter-final)
  Kento Momota (champion)'  Soong Joo Ven (third round)  Khosit Phetpradab (second round)  Thammasin Sitthikom (second round)  Soo Teck Zhi (quarter-final)  Ng Ka Long (fourth round)  C. Rohit Yadav (fourth round)  Mathias Almer (third round)  Panji Akbar Sudrajat (quarter-final)  Adam Mendrek (fourth round)  Jonathan Dolan (fourth round)  Kalle Koljonen (second round)  Thomi Azizan Mahbub (third round)  Wang Tzu-wei (third round)  Xue Song (final)''

Draw

Finals

Top half

Section 1

Section 2

Section 3

Section 4

Bottom half

Section 5

Section 6

Section 7

Section 8

References
Main Draw (Archived 2013-10-28)

2012 BWF World Junior Championships
2012 in youth sport